Panagiotis Panagiotidis (born 4 August 1998) is a Greek professional footballer who plays as a left-back for Super League 2 club Niki Volos.

References

1998 births
Living people
Greek footballers
Football League (Greece) players
Super League Greece 2 players
PAE Kerkyra players
Episkopi F.C. players
Niki Volos F.C. players
Association football defenders
Footballers from Düsseldorf